The 1910 West Virginia Mountaineers football team was an American football team that represented West Virginia University as an independent during the 1910 college football season. In its third season under head coach Charles Augustus Lueder, the team compiled a 2–4–1 record and was outscored by a total of 95 to 20. Rudolph Munk was the team captain. Munk was fatally injured in the November 12 game against Bethany College.

Schedule

References

West Virginia
West Virginia Mountaineers football seasons
West Virginia Mountaineers football